The Monterrey Steel was a professional indoor football team and a charter member of the National Arena League (NAL) that played in the 2017 season.  Based in Monterrey, Nuevo Leon, the Steel played their home games at Arena Monterrey.

The Steel were the first team from Mexico to play in an American arena/indoor football league, as well as the first team from outside the United States to play in one since the Toronto Phantoms of the Arena Football League (2001–2002).

History
On November 30, 2016, it was announced that the Monterrey Steel would be joining the National Arena League for its inaugural 2017 season.  In the announcement, the team named arena football veteran J. A. Anderson as their first head coach, and unveiled their logo and color scheme.  The Steel nickname is a tribute to Monterrey being the steel capital of Mexico, with the first mills opening in the city in 1903.

The Steel were the only team in the 2017 season to defeat the Jacksonville Sharks in the last week of the regular season at Jacksonville. They again faced the Sharks in Jacksonville one week later in a semifinal playoff game, where they lost 43–32.

During the 2017 off-season, the Steel were unable to commit for playing the 2018 season in the NAL citing the 2017 Central Mexico earthquake. By November 2017, the team website had expired. The team would eventually be removed from the league in December for failing to meet the league's minimum obligations in time for the release of the 2018 schedule. 

In January 2018, the Southern Steam of the semi-professional Elite Indoor Football announced they would play the Steel on July 1, 2018, in an international game (along with Lagartos Tamaulipas) but has not been mentioned since.

Season result

Players

Roster

Individual awards

Staff

2017 season

Standings

Schedule

Regular season
The 2017 regular season schedule was released on December 9, 2016.

Key: 

All start times are local time

Postseason

References

External links
Monterrey Steel official website

 
2016 establishments in Mexico
2017 disestablishments in Mexico